Kan District is in Tehran County, Tehran province, Iran. At the 2006 National Census, its population was 63,514 in 15,837 households. The following census in 2011 counted 2,469 people in 739 households. At the latest census in 2016, the district had 5,013 inhabitants in 1,613 households.

References 

Tehran County

Districts of Tehran Province

Populated places in Tehran Province

Populated places in Tehran County